Anne Oldfield (168323 October 1730) was an English actress and one of the highest paid actresses of her time.

Early life and discovery
She was born in London in 1683. Her father was a soldier, James Oldfield. Her mother was either Anne or Elizabeth Blanchard. Her grandfather owned a tavern and left her father several properties, he however mortgaged these which resulted in Anne and her mother being placed in financial difficulty when he died young. It appears that Oldfield received some education because her biographers state that she read widely in her youth. Oldfield and her mother went to live with her aunt, Mrs Voss, in the Mitre tavern, St James. In 1699, she attracted George Farquhar's attention when he overheard her reciting lines from Francis Beaumont and John Fletcher's play The Scornful Lady (1616) in a back room of her tavern. Soon after, she was hired by Christopher Rich to join the cast of the Theatre Royal, Drury Lane.

Career
A year later she was cast in her first small role as Candiope in John Dryden's Secret Love; or, The Maiden Queen (1699). After her success in a minor role, she was given the lead in John Fletcher's The Pilgrim (1647). In the summer of 1703, Oldfield replaced Susanna Verbruggen when her contract was terminated before the company travelled to Bath to perform for Queen Anne and her court.

Oldfield became one of Drury Lane's leading actresses. Colley Cibber acknowledged that she had as much as he to do with the success of his The Careless Husband (1704), in which she created the part of Lady Modish. Speaking of her portrayal of Lady Townly in his The Provoked Husband (1728), Cibber was to say, "that here she outdid her usual Outdoing". She also played the title role in Ben Jonson's Epicoene, and Celia in his Volpone.

Contemporary gossip is recorded that there were rivalries between Oldfield, Anne Bracegirdle, Jane Rogers and Susannah Centlivre, all of whom were supposedly vying for the best roles. In 1706 Oldfield came into conflict with the Drury Lane's management over benefits and salary she believed she had been promised, but which the theatre refused to pay. Oldfield left and joined the competing acting company at Haymarket Theatre before returning to Drury Lane shortly after with a fresh contract and a new position as joint-sharer of the Drury Lane Theatre. On a separate occasion, Oldfield was offered to become manager of the Theatre, "but her sex was thought to be an objection to that measure" thus being asked to name her own terms to stay in her old position, Oldfield received 200 guineas salary, which was ultimately raised to 500 guineas resulting in Oldfield becoming the highest paid actress of her time.

Personal life
Oldfield began a decade-long relationship with Whig politician Arthur Maynwaring around 1700. Owing to her success, Oldfield remained financially independent from Maynwaring. He supported her career by helping her work through new roles and by writing more than a dozen prologues and epilogues for her to perform. When she became pregnant with their son, Arthur. Oldfield kept acting until she was physically unable, which was unusual for the time. She went back to work just three months after the birth. Oldfield arranged for her lifelong friend, Margaret Saunders, to join the acting profession.

When Maynwaring died in 1712, rumours circulated that he had died from a venereal disease that Oldfield had given to him. In order to clear both their names, she ordered an official autopsy to be performed on his body, which revealed that he had died of tuberculosis. Oldfield was three months pregnant at the time, but her child is not believed to have survived the birth.

Several years after Maynwaring's death, Oldfield began a relationship with Charles Churchill. The two lived together for many years and had a son, Charles. However, during this pregnancy, Oldfield was unable to continue acting due to her health, and was forced to leave the theatre for several months. She never fully recovered her health.

Throughout her last theatrical season she suffered from chronic pain in her abdomen. She retired from the stage in April 1730 and died from cancer of the uterus a few months later.

Memorial

Alexander Pope, in his Sober Advice from Horace, wrote of her "Engaging Oldfield, who, with grace and ease, Could join the arts to ruin and to please."  Oldfield had said to her maid "No, let a charming chintz and Brussels lace Wrap my cold limbs and shade my lifeless face; One would not, sure, be frightful when one's dead, And Betty give this cheek a little red."

Oldfield died on 23 October 1730 at age 47, at 60 Grosvenor Street, London. She divided her property between her two sons. Oldfield was buried in Westminster Abbey, beneath the monument to Congreve. Her partner, Churchill, applied for permission to erect a monument there to her memory, but the dean of Westminster refused it.

Significant roles

 1699, Candiope – The Maiden Queen by John Dryden.
 1700, Alinda - The Pilgrim by John Fletcher.
 1701, Anne – The Unhappy Penitent by Catharine Trotter 
 1701, Cimene – The Generous Conqueror by Bevil Higgons 
 1701, Helen – The Virgin Prophetess by Elkanah Settle
 1702, Camilla – The Modish Husband by William Burnaby
 1702, Jacinta – The False Friend by John Vanbrugh 
 1703, Lucia – The Fair Example by Richard Estcourt
 1703, Victoria – The Lying Lover by Richard Steele
 1703, Belliza – Love's Contrivance  by Susanna Centlivre
 1703, Lucia – The Old Mode and the New by Thomas d'Urfey 
 1704, Lady Modish – The Careless Husband by Colley Cibber.
 1705, Arabella – Hampstead Heath by Thomas Baker 
 1706, Silvia – The Recruiting Officer by George Farquhar 
 1706, Celia – Volpone by Ben Jonson.
 1706, Isabella – The Platonick Lady by Susanna Centlivre
 1707, Lady Dainty –  The Double Gallant by Colley Cibber 
 1707, Ethelinda – The Royal Convert by Nicholas Rowe
 1707, A Silent Woman – Epiocene by Ben Jonson.
 1707, Florimel - Marriage A La Mode by John Dryden.
1708, Lady Rodomont – The Fine Lady's Airs by Thomas Baker 
 1708, Semandra –  Mithridates, King of Pontus by Nathaniel Lee
1709, Rutland – The Unhappy Favourite by John Banks.
1709, Leonara – Sir Courtly Nice by John Crowne.
1709, Carolina -Epsom Wells by Thomas Shadwell.
1709, Elvira – The Spanish Fryer, or The Double Discovery by unknown.
1709, Narcissa – Love's Last Shift by Colley Cibber.
1709, Luncinda – The Rival Fools by Colley Cibber 
1709, Maria – The Fortune Hunters, or Two Fools Well Met by James Carlile.
1709, Lady Lurewell – The Constant Couple, or A Trip to the Jubilee by George Farquhar.
1709, Hellena – The Rover, or The Banish'd Cavilier by Aphra Behn.
1709, Estifania – Rule A Wife and Have A Wife by John Fletcher.
1709, Mrs Sullen -The Beaux' Stratagem by George Farquhar.
1709, Widow- Wit Without Money by John Fletcher.
1709, Wanton Wife – The Wanton Wife by Thomas Betterton.
1709, Constantina- The Chances by John Fletcher.
1709, Belinda – The Man's Bewitched by Susanna Centlivre.
1711, Arabella – The Wife's Relief by Charles Johnson
1712, Andromache – Distrest Mother by Ambrose Philips.
1713, Marcia - Cato  by Joseph Addison.
1714, Eriphile – The Victim by Charles Johnson
1714, 'Jane Shore – Jane Shore by Nicholas Rowe
1715, Lady Jane Grey – Lady Jane Grey by Nicholas Rowe 
1716, Lady Trueman – The Drummer by Joseph Addison
 1716, Leonora – The Cruel Gift by Susanna Centlivre
1717, Atalida – The Sultaness by Charles Johnson
1717, Maria  – The Non-Juror by Colley Cibber 
1717, Rosalinda – Lucius by Delarivier Manley
1717, Mrs Townley – Three Hours After Marriage by John Gay
1719, Celona – The Spartan Dame by Thomas Southerne
1719, Sophronia – The Masquerade by Charles Johnson 
1719, Mandane – Busiris, King of Egypt by Edward Young
 1721, Sophronia – The Refusal by Colley Cibber 
1722, Mrs Watchit – The Artifice by Susanna Centlivre
1722, Indiana – The Conscious Lovers by Richard Steele
 1723, Margaret – Humphrey, Duke of Gloucester by Ambrose Philips
1724, Cylene – The Captives by John Gay
1724, Cleopatra – Caesar in Egypt by Colley Cibber
 1727, Amoret – The Rival Modes by James Moore Smythe
 1728, Lady Townly – The Provoked Husband by Colley Cibber]
 1728, Lady Matchless – Love in Several Masques by Henry Fielding
 1730, Clarinda – The Humours of Oxford by James Miller 
 1730, Sophonisba in Sophonisba by James Thomson

References

Notes

Further reading
Anonymous. Authentick Memoirs of the Life of that Celebrated Actress, Mrs. Ann Oldfield, Containing a Genuine Account of Her Transactions from Her Infancy to the Time of Her Decease, 4th edition. London: no publisher, 1730.
Egerton, William. Faithful Memoirs of the Life, Amours and Performances of that justly Celebrated, and most Eminent Actress of her Time, Mrs. Anne Oldfield. Interspersed with Several Other Dramatic Memoirs. London: no publisher, 1731.
Engel, Laura and Elaine M. McGirr, eds. Stage Mothers: Women, Work, and the Theater, 1660–1830. Lenham, Maryland: Bucknell University Press, 2014.
Gore-Browne, Robert. Gay was the Pit: the Life and Times of Anne Oldfield, Actress (1683–1730). London: Max Reinhardt, 1957.
Hays, Mary. "Mrs. Oldfield". Female Biography; or Memoirs of Illustrious and Celebrated Women of all Ages and Countries (6 volumes). London: R. Phillips, 1803, vol. 6, 28–31.
Lafler, Joanne. The Celebrated Mrs. Oldfield: the Life and Art of an Augustan Actress. Carbondale and Edwardsville: Southern Illinois University Press, 1989.
Melville, Lewis. Stage Favourites of the Eighteenth Century. Garden City, N.Y.: Doubleday Doran & Company, Inc., 1929. 
McGirr, Elaine. Eighteenth Century Characters : a Guide to the Literature of The Age. Basingstoke : Palgrave Macmillan, 2007.
Nussbaum, Felicity. Rival Queens: Actresses, Performance, and the Eighteenth-Century British Theater. Philadelphia: University of Pennsylvania Press, 2010.
Parsons, Nicola. "Mrs. Oldfield." Mary Hays, Female Biography; or, Memoirs of Illustrious and Celebrated Women, of All Ages and Countries (1803). Chawton House Library Series: Women’s Memoirs, ed. Gina Luria Walker, Memoirs of Women Writers Part III. Pickering & Chatto: London, 2013, vol. 10, 30–3, editorial notes, 548–51.
Project Continua – at ProjectContinua.org
Ritchie, Fiona. Women and Shakespeare in the Eighteenth Century. New York: Cambridge University Press, 2014.

1683 births
1730 deaths
English stage actresses
18th-century English actresses
British tailors
Actresses from London
Burials at Westminster Abbey
Deaths from uterine cancer
Deaths from cancer in England